Cynthia Scott  (born January 1, 1939) is a Canadian award-winning filmmaker who has produced, directed, written, and edited several films with the National Film Board of Canada (NFB). Her works have won the Oscar and Canadian Film Award. Scott is a member of the Royal Canadian Academy of Arts. Her projects with the NFB are mainly focused on documentary filmmaking. Some of Scott's most notable documentaries for the NFB feature dancing and the dance world including Flamenco at 5:15 (1983), which won an Academy Award for Best Documentary (Short Subject) at the 56th Academy Awards in 1984. She is married to filmmaker John N. Smith.

Background

Cynthia Scott was born and raised in Winnipeg, Manitoba. She grew up in a self-described working-class family that fostered her creativity growing up. She studied English Literature and Philosophy at the University of Manitoba, graduating with a B.A. in 1959, at the age of 19.

Early career in media

After graduation, Scott worked at the Manitoba Theatre Centre as a second assistant director before moving to London, England where she worked as a researcher for Patrick Wilson and Douglas Leiterman on This Hour Has Seven Days. In 1965, she returned to Canada and began working as a public affairs producer for the Canadian Broadcasting Corporation television program Take 30, where she stayed for nearly a decade. Scott insists that her intrigue in film started at a very young age. Despite her interest in filmmaking, Scott explains that she originally believed that director work was solely for men and that directing positions were unattainable for women. In her interview with Sarah Kernochan Scott gives credit to her job as an assistant to a producer at the Manitoba Theatre Centre for showing her that women could also do this work. After working in television Scott learned that she wished to pursue filmmaking. Scott has stated that her filmmaking career began in documentaries then later on in her career her interest shifted to drama. Scott claims that she gained the ability to produce films without experiencing gender discrimination by creating a name for herself after winning an Oscar award or her documentary Flamenco at 5:15. In an interview with fellow filmmaker Sarah Kernochan Scott insists that there were other filmmakers who had ideas around casting a film with only female actors however, she was the first woman filmmaker to come forward with the idea.

Filmmaking with the NFB

Scott's career took a turn in 1972 when the National Film Board of Canada hired her as a staff director. She immediately began directing, producing and writing both documentary and fiction pieces for the NFB. She mainly worked on slice-of-life documentaries with a mind for social issues. In her first year with the NFB, she directed a 26-minute documentary named The Ungrateful Land: Roch Carrier Remembers Ste-Justine (1972). Her debut directing work would then go on to win a Canadian Film Award for direction in a TV Information program. In 1976, Scott produced the controversial Barbara Greene documentary Listen Listen Listen (1976) for the NFB.

Once she had been working at the NFB for about a decade, she co-wrote, co-edited and co-produced a NFB joint project titled For The Love of Dance (1981). Over the next several years, Scott would work on several documentaries set in the dance world, including Flamenco at 5:15 (1983), which won an Academy Award for Best Documentary Short Subject.

She also researched and co-wrote First Winter (1982), directed by John N. Smith (her spouse and fellow filmmaker), which received an Academy Award nomination for Best Live Action Short at the 54th Academy Awards.

During her time with the National Film Board of Canada, Scott went on to participate in a women in the directors chair workshop  in Banff, Alberta. In her Sarah Kernochan interview Scott describes this intensive workshop is an opportunity to educate and bring women directors together.

The Company of Strangers 
In the late 1980s, Scott began developing a full-length docufiction film with the NFB featuring eight non-actresses, all but one of whom were senior citizens. The Company of Strangers (US title: Strangers in Good Company), released in 1990, features a heavily improvised script based on the real lives of the women cast. The film was a huge success in both Canada and international markets; it became the highest grossing NFB produced film ever at the time.

In an interview with Sarah Kernochan Scott states that while she was working on her film The Company of Strangers her production team members were all women. Scott chose to have a strictly female team in order to place emphasis on the importance of women in the film industry supporting each other.  Scott's team for this movie consisted of female assistants, producers, writers and artists.

Flamenco at 5:15 
Cynthia Scott directed the short documentary film Flamenco at 5:15. The film was released in 1983. Flamenco at 5:15 is an Oscar award winning film that jump started Scott's career. Flamenco at 5:15 focuses on the reality of what it is like to be inside a Flamenco dance class at the National Ballet of Canada. Flamenco at 5:15 went on to win the best short documentary award at the 56th annual Academy Awards.

After career 
Scott is currently recovering from cancer. Before being diagnosed, she was in development on an adaptation of The Stone Diaries, a 1993 fictional autobiography written by Carol Shields. She has said she plans to go back into development on The Stone Diaries once her health has returned to normal.

However, in a 2004 interview with Sarah Kernochan, Scott described herself to Kernochan as "retired now".

In an interview about the success of her film The Company of Strangers Scot expressed that she has taken an interest in learning the French language as she wishes to speak the language fluently. Scott an her husband John N. Smith have spent a number of summers residing on currant lake in Dunany, Quebec. The Dunany community organization honoured Scott by holding an event at the community club house where her Oscar award winning documentary Flamenco at 5:15 was screened.

Filmography

Director filmography

The Ungrateful Land: Roch Carrier Remembers Ste-Justine (1972)
Some Natives of Churchill (1973)
Scoggie (1975)
For the Love of Dance (1981) (co-directed with John N. Smith, Michael McKennirey and David Wilson)
Flamenco at 5:15 (1983)
Discussions in Bioethics: A Chronic Problem (1985)
Jack of Hearts (1986)
The Company of Strangers (1990)

Co-writer filmography

First Winter (1982) (co-written with Gloria Demers)
The Company of Strangers (1990) (co-written with David Wilson, Sally Bochner and Gloria Demers)

Producer filmography

Take 30 series (1965–72) (TV, 71 episodes) (co-producer)
Man Alive: Jack Chambers (1971)
West series: Ruth and Harriet: Two Women of the Piece (1973)
West series: Every Saturday Night 
Some Natives of Churchill (1973)
Listen Listen Listen (1976) (co-produced with Roman Kroitor)
Canada Vignettes: Holidays (1978)
Canada Vignettes: The Thirties (1978)
You've Got the Power: Arioli: Running (1979)
You've Got the Power: Teenagers (1979)
Man of Might: Fit In (1979)
For the Love of Dance (1981) (co-produced with John N. Smith, Michael McKennirey, David Wilson and Adam Symansky)
Flamenco at 5:15 (1983) (co-produced with Adam Symansky)

Co-editor filmography

For the Love of Dance (1981) (co-edited with John N. Smith, Micheal McKennirey and David Wilson)
Flamenco at 5:15 (1983) (co-edited with Paul Demers)

Awards and nominations
The Ungrateful Land: Roch Carrier Remembers Ste-Justine (1972):
Canadian Film Awards: Best TV Information Programme - won

First Winter (1982):
54th Academy Awards: Best Live Action Short - nominated

Flamenco at 5:15 (1983):
56th Academy Awards: Best Documentary Short - won

The Company of Strangers (1990):
:fr:Association québécoise des critiques de cinéma: Best Quebec Feature Film - won
12th Genie Awards: Best Picture - nominated
12th Genie Awards: Film Editing - won
Paris Lesbian and Feminist Film Festival: Best Feature Film
Vancouver International Film Festival: Most Popular Canadian Film
International Filmfestival Mannheim-Heidelberg: Grand Newcomer Award

See also
 List of female film and television directors
 List of LGBT-related films directed by women

References

Further reading

Cinema Canada. NFB fetes Hollywood heroes Scott and Symansky. Interview with Cynthia Scott, Adam Symansky. Cinema Canada, May 1984.
Cloutier, Anne. Sereine complicité. Interview with Cynthia Scott. 24 Images, no. 54, Spring 1991. [in French]
Currat, Joëlle, Élodie François, Anna Lupien, and Pascale Navarro. 40 ans de vues rêvées : l'imaginaire des cinéastes québécoises depuis 1972. Edited by Marquise Lepage. Montréal: Réalisatrices Équitables/Éditions Somme toute, 2014. Photographies, Anna Lupien. [in French] (pp. 232–234)
D'Arcy, Jan. Magic shadows: Cynthia Scott. Canadian Forum, vol. 71, June 1992.
Floyd, Nigel. Nigel Floyd meets Cynthia Scott. Interview with Cynthia Scott. Time Out, May 1, 1991.
Watson, Patricia. Cynthia Scott and The Company of Strangers: An interview. Canadian Woman Studies / Les Cahiers de la femme 12, no. 2 (1992): 109–114.

External links

Scott's Oscar speech from 1984
Films directed by Scott at NFB.ca
Cynthia Scott fonds (R825) at Library and Archives Canada

1939 births
Living people
Canadian women film directors
Canadian women screenwriters
Canadian documentary film directors
Film directors from Winnipeg
Writers from Winnipeg
Members of the Royal Canadian Academy of Arts
Directors of Best Documentary Short Subject Academy Award winners
National Film Board of Canada people
Canadian documentary film producers
Canadian women film producers
20th-century Canadian screenwriters
21st-century Canadian screenwriters
Canadian women documentary filmmakers